Albert McKinley Rains (March 11, 1902 – March 22, 1991) was a U.S. Representative from Alabama.

Born in Grove Oak, Alabama, Rains attended the public schools, Snead Seminary, Boaz, Alabama, State Teachers College (now Jacksonville State University), Jacksonville, Alabama, and the University of Alabama at Tuscaloosa.
He studied law, was admitted to the bar in 1928 and commenced practice in Gadsden, Alabama, in 1929.  He served as deputy solicitor for Etowah County, Alabama from 1930 to 1935, and as city attorney for the city of Gadsden, Alabama from 1935 to 1944.  He served as a member of the Alabama House of Representatives 1941–1944.

Rains was elected as a Democrat to the Seventy-ninth and to the nine succeeding Congresses (January 3, 1945 – January 3, 1965).  Having been a signatory to the 1956 Southern Manifesto that opposed the desegregation of public schools ordered by the Supreme Court in Brown v. Board of Education, he voted against H.R. 6127, Civil Rights Act of 1957. He was not a candidate for renomination to the Eighty-ninth Congress.  He served as chairman of board, First City National Bank (later First Alabama Bank of Gadsden) until becoming chairman emeritus in 1979.  He was a resident of Gadsden, Alabama, until his death there on March 22, 1991.

References

1902 births
1991 deaths
People from DeKalb County, Alabama
Baptists from Alabama
Alabama lawyers
American segregationists
Democratic Party members of the Alabama House of Representatives
University of Alabama alumni
Democratic Party members of the United States House of Representatives from Alabama
20th-century American lawyers
20th-century American politicians
20th-century Baptists